The Rivers State Ministry of Women Affairs is the civil service department of Rivers State charged with advising the government on policies and programs involving women and gender equality. The ministry was formed in 1997 and took over the functions of the former Rivers State Commission for Women. Its current headquarters is at Marine Base, Port Harcourt.

As of 2016, the Commissioner in charge of the ministry is Ukel Oyaghiri while the Permanent Secretary is Atosemi Teetito.

Functions
Formulation of policies that promotes gender equality and empowering women
To formulate programmes that will develop the potentials of women and girls
To identify problems militating against women and girls
To collaborate with government agencies to address societal issues that militates against the advancement of women
To provide career guidance and counselling
To provide mass literacy involving informal and functional literacy

List of commissioners
The following is a list of commissioners of the Rivers State Ministry of Women Affairs.

Mediline Ingowari Tador (1997–1999)
Gloria Fiofori (1999–2003)
Ibitoru Linda Ofili (2003–2007)
Nancy Nwankwo (2007)
Manuela George-Izunwa (2007–2011)
Joeba West (2011–2015)
Ukel Oyaghiri (2015–)

See also
Gender equality
Women empowerment
Women in government

External links
Ministry of Women Affairs

Women Affairs
Women's ministries
1997 establishments in Nigeria
1990s establishments in Rivers State
Women in Rivers State
Women's rights in Nigeria